Samuel James Togwell (born 14 October 1984) is an English former professional footballer who plays as a defensive midfielder for  club Beaconsfield Town.

He began his career with Crystal Palace in 2002, where he was loaned out to Oxford United, Northampton Town, and Port Vale. In July 2006 he transferred to Barnsley, before he joined Scunthorpe United in August 2008. He helped the "Iron" to win promotion out of the League One play-offs in 2009. He signed with Chesterfield in July 2012, and became a key player in the 2012–13 season. He lost his first team place the following season and was loaned out to Wycombe Wanderers. He helped Chesterfield to win the League Two title in 2013–14. He signed with Barnet in August 2014, and helped the club to the Conference title in the 2014–15 season. He was sold on to Eastleigh in December 2016, before joining Slough Town in June 2018. He retired in May 2021, having made a total of 606 appearances in all competitions, scoring 23 goals. He came out of retirement the following year to play for Beaconsfield Town.

Career

Crystal Palace
Togwell started out in the Crystal Palace youth set-up at the age of ten, before making his senior debut as a seventeen-year-old substitute on 22 December 2002 at Millmoor. Palace beat Rotherham United 3–1, returning to London with three First Division points.

He did not get another game in the 2002–03 or 2003–04 seasons, mainly due to a broken leg he sustained in a reserve match in February 2003. He returned to fitness in September 2003. Togwell joined League Two club Oxford United on loan on 22 October 2004. He made five appearances before returning to Selhurst Park the next month. He rejected a loan move to Norwegian club Viking FK, who were managed by Roy Hodgson. On 24 March 2005, he went back into the basement division to join Northampton Town on a one-month loan. He made eight appearances, before his loan deal was extended to cover the play-offs. Southend United defeated the "Cobblers" in the semi-finals, before beating Lincoln City in the final.

Togwell, by now captain of the reserve team, played in the opening three rounds of the League Cup in 2005–06, including a 2–1 defeat of European Champions Liverpool in which he marked Steven Gerrard. On 10 November 2005, he joined League One club Port Vale on a six-week loan deal. He impressed at Vale Park, especially on 6 January when he scored both goals of a FA Cup Third Round defeat of Doncaster Rovers. Having already had the loan extended once, Martin Foyle managed to extend the deal until the end of the season after Togwell played some excellent football in January. In March, Vale made Palace an offer, to sign the young midfielder permanently in the summer. The next month, with Togwell and Vale agreed on personal terms, chairman Bill Bratt admitted that the two clubs were a long way from agreeing a deal, with Palace demanding a large sum in transfer fees. The cash-strapped club were forced to abandon hope of signing Togwell after their £50,000 transfer bid was rejected, though handed him the club's "Young Player of The Year" award in recognition of his performances in his 30 games that season.

Barnsley
His tenure at Palace did not last much longer, however, as he left for Barnsley on 12 July 2006 for an undisclosed fee which was later reported to be £60,000. Togwell made his League debut for Barnsley on 5 August 2006, in a 2–1 defeat at Cardiff City. He made 46 appearances in 2006–07, including both Championship clashes with former club Palace, both of which finished 2–0 for the home team. Battling with Bobby Hassell and new signing Anderson Silva de França for a first team place, he found life tough at Oakwell the next season. In all he played 27 games, three of which came in the club's impressive FA Cup run, including a substitute appearance in the memorable victory over Premier League team Chelsea.

Scunthorpe United

He joined Scunthorpe United on a free transfer in August 2008, signing a two-year deal. The young midfield battler was optimistic of the club's future, predicting promotion. His prophecy was fulfilled at Wembley, as the "Iron" defeated Millwall 3–2 in the play-off final. He remained a key member of Scunthorpe's first team in the Championship; making 47 appearances in 2009–10, he managed to bag a goal against his former employers at Selhurst Park in the process. Signing a new two-year deal in June 2010, Togwell recovered from a knee injury to make 40 appearances in the 2010–11 campaign. He was given the club's Player of the Year award, the Ernie Storey Memorial Trophy, however he could not prevent the "Iron" from finishing in last place and thereby suffer relegation back into League One. He made 44 appearances in 2011–12, as Alan Knill led the Glanford Park outfit to an 18th-place finish in League One. However he was one of ten players released by the club in May 2012.

Chesterfield
In July 2012, Togwell joined League Two club Chesterfield on a two-year contract. He made 50 appearances in the 2012–13 campaign. On 14 March 2014, Togwell joined fellow League Two club Wycombe Wanderers on a one-month loan deal. He made his debut for the "Chairboys" the next day in a 2–0 defeat to York City, and gave away a penalty before being sent off for two bookable offences. He returned from suspension to play three games for Wycombe before being recalled by Chesterfield on 9 April. He played a total of ten games for Chesterfield as the "Spireites" won promotion as divisional champions in 2013–14, and was released by manager Paul Cook in the summer.

Barnet
Togwell joined Barnet of the Conference Premier in August 2014. He missed just four league games of the 2014–15 season as Martin Allen's "Bees" won promotion back into the English Football League as champions of the Conference. He played 40 games in the 2015–16 season and signed a one-year contract extension in May. He underwent a hernia operation in October 2016, which kept him out of action for six weeks. In total he played 99 times for the Bees, scoring one goal.

Eastleigh
On 15 December 2016, Togwell joined National League club Eastleigh for a fee of £20,000. He signed an 18-month contract; the move reunited him with former Barnet manager Martin Allen. He was appointed as club captain one month later following the departure of Joe Partington. However he endured a difficult 2017–18 campaign, which started badly as he was ruled out for the first half of the season after picking up a thigh injury in August. By the time he recovered to full fitness manager Richard Hill had been replaced by Andy Hessenthaler, who opted to release Togwell at the end of the campaign.

Slough Town
Togwell joined newly promoted National League South club Slough Town in June 2018, where he joined up with his brother Lee. As well as playing together, the brothers also ran a personal training business together. He scored three goals in 44 matches in the 2018–19 season, helping the "Rebels" to reach the Second Round of the FA Cup, where they were beaten by Gillingham. Slough beat Reading Under-23s 3–1 in the 2019 Berks & Bucks Senior Cup final, with Togwell scoring a brace and his brother scoring the other goal. He scored two goals in 34 games during the 2019–20 season, helping Slough to qualify for the play-off quarter-finals, where they were beaten 3–0 by Dartford. He made 13 appearances before the 2020–21 season was curtailed early due to the COVID-19 pandemic in England. He announced his retirement in May 2021.

Beaconsfield Town
Togwell came out of retirement to play for Southern League Premier Division South club Beaconsfield Town in the 2022–23 season.

Career statistics

Honours
Individual
Scunthorpe United F.C. Player of the Year: 2011

Scunthorpe United
Football League One play-offs: 2008–09

Chesterfield
Football League Two: 2013–14

Barnet
Conference Premier: 2014–15

Slough Town
Berks & Bucks Senior Cup: 2019

References

1984 births
Living people
People from Beaconsfield
English footballers
Association football midfielders
Barnsley F.C. players
Crystal Palace F.C. players
Oxford United F.C. players
Northampton Town F.C. players
Port Vale F.C. players
Scunthorpe United F.C. players
Chesterfield F.C. players
Wycombe Wanderers F.C. players
Barnet F.C. players
Eastleigh F.C. players
Slough Town F.C. players
Beaconsfield Town F.C. players
English Football League players
National League (English football) players
Southern Football League players